Pristimantis scolodiscus is a species of frog in the family Strabomantidae. It is found on the Pacific slopes of the Andes in northern Ecuador (Esmeraldas and Carchi Provinces) and in the Colombian Massif in the Nariño Department in the adjacent south-western Colombia.

Description
Males measure  and females  in snout–vent length. The dorsum is slightly granular and (pale) orange in colouration, sometimes with brown specks; the belly is white. The iris is greyish blue. The tympanum is indistinct. The males have vocal sacks. The disk of the third finger has a papilla on its tip, hence the specific name scolodiscus, from Greek skolos (pointed) and diskus (disk).

Habitat and conservation
Pristimantis scolodiscus inhabit dense, undisturbed cloud forests.

The species is threatened by habitat loss caused by agricultural development. Also chytridiomycosis might be a threat. It occurs in the La Planada National Reserve in Colombia—its type locality—and might occur in the Reserva Ecológica Cotacachi-Cayapas in Ecuador.

References

scolodiscus
Amphibians of the Andes
Amphibians of Colombia
Amphibians of Ecuador
Amphibians described in 1990
Taxa named by John Douglas Lynch
Taxonomy articles created by Polbot